Thomas Niedermayer, OBE (1928–1973) was a German industrialist, who was kidnapped by, and died while in the hands of, the Provisional IRA in 1973. He was managing director of the Grundig factory in Belfast, and the West German honorary consul for Northern Ireland.

Abduction
Niedermayer was kidnapped on 27 December 1973, at around 11 pm, from his home in West Belfast, by two IRA members who lured him outside his house on the pretext that they had accidentally crashed into his car. The abduction incident was witnessed by his two teenage daughters, who had answered the door to them, and by a neighbour who worked at the Grundig factory.

The Government of the United Kingdom denied at the time that it had received any subsequent demands from the IRA in relation to the kidnapping, but several years later it was revealed that it had done so, and had briefly attempted to negotiate, with the IRA seeking the transferral from imprisonment in Great Britain to Northern Ireland of two of its members who had been jailed for involvement in a bombing campaign in London in 1973. However, the negotiations had ended abruptly from the IRA's side without explanation.

In March 1980, the Royal Ulster Constabulary, acting on information received, located Niedermayer's body lying face down, with hands tied, and gagged, in a shallow grave at an illegal rubbish dump at Colin Glen. A forensic examination revealed that the cause of death had been severe injuries sustained to the head after being pistol-whipped with a handgun.

His funeral took place at Dunmurry, and he was buried in the church's graveyard.

Criminal trial and after
Eugene McManus (IRA Belfast Brigade Adjutant in 1973) and 42-year-old John Bradley (also an IRA member) were charged in connection with the crime. Bradley was originally charged with murder, but at his trial in 1981 he pleaded guilty to manslaughter, stating that he had accidentally killed Niedermayer whilst he was trying to escape. McManus pleaded guilty to withholding information about the crime and IRA membership. Bradley was subsequently sentenced to twenty years' imprisonment, and McManus to five years' imprisonment.

Information later obtained by the Royal Ulster Constabulary revealed that the kidnapping operation had been set in motion by Brian Keenan, a former employee at the Belfast Grundig factory that Niedermayer had been the Director of, where Keenan, as a Trade Union representative, had had several confrontations with Niedermayer.

Subsequent events
Niedermayer's wife, Ingeborg, returned to Ireland in 1990, ten years to the day after her husband's funeral, and booked into a hotel in Bray, where she died by suicide by walking into the sea from an isolated beach. Niedermayer's two daughters, Renate and Gabrielle, also died, in 1991 and 1994 respectively, with Gabrielle committing suicide. Gabrielle's husband, Robin Williams-Powell, killed himself five years later in 1999. Gabrielle and Robin are survived by their two daughters, Tanya and Rachel.

See also
 Tiede Herrema, a Dutch businessman kidnapped in 1975, rescued after a two-week-long hostage siege.
 John Hely-Hutchinson, 7th Earl of Donoughmore, kidnapped along with his wife in 1974, both released unharmed.
 List of kidnappings
 List of solved missing person cases

References

External links
A Knock on the Door, RTE Radio, 16 February 2013
He was abducted by an IRA gang, pistol-whipped and buried face down, so that he could only dig himself in deeper, Belfast Telegraph, 23/04/2010
Der Spiegel, Nr. 6/1974, Waffen im Container

Further reading
 Duplicity and Deception: Policing the Twilight Zone of the Troubles by Alan Simpson
The Killing of Thomas Niedermayer by David Blake Knox, New Island Books, Pub. 

1928 births
1970s murders in Northern Ireland
1973 crimes in Ireland
1973 deaths
1973 in Northern Ireland
20th-century German businesspeople
Formerly missing people
German expatriates in the United Kingdom
German terrorism victims
Kidnapped businesspeople
Kidnapped German people
Missing person cases in Ireland
People killed by the Provisional Irish Republican Army
Terrorism deaths in Northern Ireland
Terrorist incidents in the United Kingdom in 1973